Julian Konstantinov (Bulgarian: Юлиян Константинов) (also Yuliyan Konstantinov) (born 1966) is a Bulgarian operatic bass particularly known for his interpretations of the works of Wolfgang Amadeus Mozart, Giuseppe Verdi, and the bel canto roles of Rossini and Donizetti. More recently he has become associated with the title role in Modest Mussorgsky's Boris Godunov, a role he has sung in numerous opera houses.

Career
Konstantinov studied opera under Assen Selimski at the Bulgarian Music Academy in Sofia from 1987 to 1993. He made his professional opera debut while still a student at the Sofia National Opera in a minor role in Rossini's The Barber of Seville. He also appeared in a production of Stravinsky's The Rake's Progress while still a student. In 1993 he garnered wide attention when he won the BBC Cardiff Singer of the World competition and he was soon cast is several major roles in opera houses throughout Europe. In 1995 he made his debuts with Wexford Festival Opera and the Teatro Colón in Buenos Aires. This was soon followed by his debut at La Scala, making him the youngest bass ever to sing at the prestigious opera house. His other international appearances have taken him to Germany, France, Spain, Holland, Brazil, Great Britain and the United States. In 1998 he recorded the role of Oroe in Rossini's Semiramide with Edita Gruberova in the title role. In 1999 he sang the role of Moser in Verdi's I masnadieri with the Opera Orchestra of New York. In 2001, he joined Angela Gheorghiu, Daniela Barcellona, Roberto Alagna, and the Berlin Philharmonic in a production of Verdi's Requiem under the baton of Claudio Abbado. In 2002, he sang the title role in Boris Godunov with Opéra Bastille and the role of Fiesco in Simon Boccanegra with the Maggio Musicale Fiorentino. In 2003 he sang the role of Boris again at the Grand Théâtre de Genève and the role of Padre Guardiano in Verdi's La forza del destino at Carnegie Hall in New York City. That same year his recording of Ralph Vaughan Williams's Sea Symphony with Robert Spano, Christine Goerke, and the Atlanta Symphony Orchestra won a Grammy Award. In 2004 he made his Metropolitan Opera debut as Sparafucile in Verdi's Rigoletto, a role he later recorded that year at the Liceu. In 2005 he performed the role of Roger in Verdi's Jérusalem with conductor Paolo Olmi conducts the Netherlands Radio Symphony Orchestra and Choir.

Konstantinov has spent much of his career singing roles with the Sofia National Opera where he has appeared as Mephistopheles in Gounod's Faust, Raimondo in Donizetti's Lucia di Lammermoor, Count Walter in Verdi's Luisa Miller, Sparafucile in Verdi's Rigoletto, Fiesco in Verdi's Simon Boccanegra, Sarastro in Mozart's Die Zauberflöte, both Don Pedro and the title role in Mozart's Don Giovanni, and as Timur in Puccini's Turandot among other roles.

Family
Konstantinov's younger brother, Plamen Konstantinov, is a former volleyball player and captain of the Bulgaria men's national volleyball team and last played for Iraklis VC in the Greek A1 Volleyball League.

Controversy
On 20 May 2012, Konstantinov allegedly has assaulted a Bulgarian journalist, Kiril Hristov, after seeing the latter turning up his SUV's wipers. Mr. Hristov apparently did this as a protest for having Konstantinov's car improperly parked. The incident gained fast publicity among the Bulgarian online community. Both Mr. Hristov and Mr. Konstantinov wrote their versions of what happened.

Discography

Choral and symphonic

Opera recordings

References

External links 
 Julian Konstantinov at Bulgarian Rock Archives
 Юлиан Константинов наби водещ на БНТ
 Оперният певец Юлиян Константинов набил журналист от БНТ1

1966 births
Living people
21st-century Bulgarian male opera singers
20th-century Bulgarian male opera singers
Operatic basses
Musicians from Sofia